Slaughter Slough is a wetland in southwestern Minnesota, United States, so named for being the site of the Lake Shetek Massacre during the Dakota War of 1862.  It is located in Murray County east of Lake Shetek.  On August 20, 1862, about 40 Dakota men attacked the Euro-American settlers living nearby, killing 15 and taking a dozen women and children captive.  21 settlers escaped or survived the attack and made difficult journeys across the prairie to safety.  A band of pacifist Dakota later ransomed the eight surviving captives, who were reunited with their families.

Today the site is managed by the U.S. Fish and Wildlife Service as Slaughter Slough Waterfowl Production Area, a component of the Windom Wetland Management District.  It is developed with interpretive signage, a short trail, and a memorial.

The Lake Shetek settlement
About 50 Euro-American settlers from perhaps a dozen families were living along the east shore of Lake Shetek in August 1862.

The first homesteaders arrived in 1855. By 1862 at least 9 families had cabins spread along  of lakeshore.  Listed roughly north to south they were the Meyers, the Hurds, the Kochs, the Irelands, the Eastlicks, the Duleys, the Smiths, the Wrights, and the Everetts.  There were also a few single men.

The settlers interacted and traded with the local Dakota people. Some even spoke the Dakota language passably.

The Dakota
The growing Euro-American population, however, was making it increasingly difficult for the easternmost Dakota people to pursue their traditional lifestyle. Resettlement on reservations, treaty violations by the United States, and late or unfair annuity payments by Indian agents caused increasing hunger and hardship among the Dakota.  Pushed to the breaking point, a council of Dakota leaders decided to wage war on the whites on August 17, 1862.

The declaration of war reached White Lodge and Lean Grizzly Bear, the chiefs of two bands living northwest of Lake Shetek.  Their villages were Sisseton Dakota, a sub-tribe still living beyond the frontier that had not been signatory to any treaties with the United States.  About 40 warriors and at least a few women set out to help combat white encroachment on their land.  A third Sisseton band, headed by Old Pawn, was camped near the Wrights' cabin at the south end of the Lake Shetek settlement.

The attack begins
On the morning of Wednesday, August 20, 1862, the Dakota entered the settlement from the north.  At the first cabin they simply trampled through the cornfield and vandalized a fence, leaving the Meyers family perplexed but unharmed. At the next cabin, the Hurds', darker tidings revealed themselves. Phineas Hurd and another settler were long overdue from scouting land in Dakota Territory.  Now his wife Alomina recognized that one of the Dakota men was riding her husband's horse.  Some of the men followed her into the cabin, which woke one of the Hurds' two children.  John Voigt, whom Mr. Hurd had hired to work in his absence, carried the crying toddler outside.  Without warning one of the Dakota shot Voigt dead (though the child was unharmed).  Many more Dakota men then leapt out of hiding and looted the cabin.

Mrs. Hurd was told that she and the children would be spared if she didn't warn the other settlers.  Refusing them additional food or clothing, some Dakota men escorted the Hurds  from home and pointed them in the direction of New Ulm.

The Dakota next arrived at the cabin of Andreas and Mariah Koch (pronounced "Cook"), immigrants from Germany with no children. Andreas was asked to bring water from the well and was then shot from behind. Mariah, emerging from the cabin, was told to flee, and ran toward a neighbor's without interference.

John Voigt and Andreas Koch were the only people killed within the settlement. Voigt had recently angered some Dakota, and Koch had poor relations with them due to his broken English.  Conversely both Andrew Meyers and Alomina Hurd had been friendly towards the Dakota and spoke their language, which she credited for her and her children being spared.  At the beginning of the attack the victims may have been the target of specific grudges.

The settlers flee
Two chance visitors to the Hurd cabin spread the alarm about the coming attack. Charlie Hatch was living with his sister Almira Everett and her family at the south end of the settlement. Coming to borrow the Hurds' oxen, he instead found John Voigt's body and the looted cabin.  Running back to tell the others, he saw the mob of Dakota around the Koch homestead.  Meanwhile, the Meyers cabin at the north end of the settlement had so far been bypassed by the war party.  Mrs. Meyers was quite sick with pneumonia, so 10-year-old Arthur had been sent to the Hurds to ask for some bread.  When he returned with the news of the violence done there, Mr. Meyers went to warn the Kochs. Instead he found Andreas dead and heard the Dakota men nearby, so rushed back and hustled his family of six into their wagon to flee.

Hatch rushed through the settlement warning all the others, accelerated by a horse lent to him by the Eastlicks' boarder Mr. Rhodes. The settlers decided to gather at the most defensible structure, the two-story Wright house built on higher ground.

As the settlers gathered at the Wright home they encountered Old Pawn and members of his band, who were camped nearby and well-known to the whites.  Old Pawn offered to fight on their side.  The 34 settlers and 8 Dakota crowded into the Wright home and prepared their paltry defenses.  The whites argued about strategy and whether they should trust Old Pawn's Dakota men.

The men fired a volley when the hostile Dakota came in view, and Old Pawn offered to negotiate with them.  He returned with this deal: abandon the settlement and their belongings and the whites would be spared. The settlers argued and ultimately held a vote, accepting the offer.  The group started for New Ulm in a wagon and on foot.

Taking cover in the slough
After the settlers had proceeded a mile or two, the Dakota men appeared behind them in hot pursuit.  Old Pawn was among them. Henry Smith and Mr. Rhodes panicked and ran, though William Duley shouted at them to stay or at least leave their guns. Rhodes was a bachelor boarding with the Eastlicks, but Smith abandoned his own wife.

Duley suggested the party take cover in a nearby slough, reed-filled and mostly dry in late summer. On the way the parties exchanged fire, and several settlers were wounded.

After this, the Dakota men began killing the settlers: fifteen settlers, including three of Duley's children, were killed and Duley's wife and seven others were taken captive.

Aftermath
The captive settlers were freed four months later when other white settlers ran across a group of Dakota with the captives and traded supplies for their freedom. Abraham Lincoln authorized the execution of the Dakota involved in the massacre and kidnapping. William Duley was the executioner at the hanging of thirty-eight Dakota on December 26.

References

External links
1862 war site being restored
Shetek Massacre

Dakota War of 1862
Massacres by Native Americans
Protected areas of Murray County, Minnesota
United States Fish and Wildlife Service
Wetlands of Minnesota
Landforms of Murray County, Minnesota